The Bet (French title: Le Pari) is a 1997 film directed, about smoking cessation, written by and starring Didier Bourdon and Bernard Campan of the French comic trio Les Inconnus ("The Unknowns").

Plot 

Bernard is a teacher in the suburbs and lives with Victoria. Didier is a wealthy Parisian pharmacist and is married to Murielle, Victoria's sister. While the former drives a rusty car, the latter drives a black Mercedes. Both brothers-in-law are complete opposites and hate each other. During dinner, Didier and Bernard make a bet: to stop smoking for fifteen days, until the next family get-together. The first days go off like a dream and both are on top of the world. But things quickly turn sour. Didier and Bernard find it harder and harder to resist the temptation. They become irritable, suspicious, they lie; until the fifteenth day: the family get-together. They have kept their word, but relations between them and their wives are at an all-time low. Despite this, they are both determined to remain non-smokers.

Cast
 Didier Bourdon as Didier
 Bernard Campan as Bernard
 Isabelle Ferron as Murielle
 Isabel Otero as Victoria
 Hélène Surgère as Madame Ramirez
 Roger Ibáñez as Vincente Ramirez
 Kelly Lawson as Élodie
 François Berléand as Doctor Bricourt
 Jean-Roger Milo as Policeman
 Régis Laspalès as Gilbert
 Pascal Légitimus as A guest

References

External links 
 
 

1997 films
1997 comedy films
French comedy films
Smoking cessation
Films produced by Claude Berri
Films directed by Didier Bourdon
1990s French films